Oskar Alfred Daniel "Fred" Warngård (9 May 1907 – 23 May 1950) was a Swedish hammer thrower. He won a bronze medal at the 1936 Summer Olympics setting a national record at 54.83 m.

Warngård held the national titles in the hammer throw (1936 and 1938) and weight throw (1936 and 1939). He was a criminal detective by profession.

References

External links 
 

1907 births
1950 deaths
Swedish male hammer throwers
Olympic athletes of Sweden
Athletes (track and field) at the 1936 Summer Olympics
Olympic bronze medalists for Sweden
Medalists at the 1936 Summer Olympics
Olympic bronze medalists in athletics (track and field)
People from Vellinge Municipality
Sportspeople from Skåne County